Rodolphe Antoine Pierre Thérèse Poma (12 October 1885 – 1954), also known as Rudolph Poma, was a rower who competed in the 1900 Summer Olympics and 1908 Summer Olympics for Belgium. He competed in 1900 as coxswain of the Royal Club Nautique de Gand which won the silver medal in the coxed eight and in 1908 as rower of the same club which won the silver medal in the coxed eight.

References

External links

1885 births
1954 deaths
Belgian male rowers
Olympic rowers of Belgium
Olympic silver medalists for Belgium
Rowers at the 1900 Summer Olympics
Rowers at the 1908 Summer Olympics
Olympic medalists in rowing
Medalists at the 1900 Summer Olympics
Medalists at the 1908 Summer Olympics
European Rowing Championships medalists
20th-century Belgian people
Royal Club Nautique de Gand rowers
Date of death missing
Place of death missing